Marquard Bohm (27 June 1941 – 3 February 2006) was a German actor. He appeared in more than 100 films and television shows between 1965 and 2000. He starred in the 1982 film Eine deutsche Revolution, which was entered into the 32nd Berlin International Film Festival. His older brother was the actor and director Hark Bohm.

Filmography

References

External links

1941 births
2006 deaths
German male film actors
20th-century German male actors
Male actors from Hamburg